Monte Caseros Department is a  department of Corrientes Province in Argentina.

Settlements
Colonia Libertad
Juan Pujol
Mocoretá
Monte Caseros

External links
Monte Caseros website 

Departments of Corrientes Province